Jesionowo may refer to the following places:
Jesionowo, Kuyavian-Pomeranian Voivodeship (north-central Poland)
Jesionowo, Braniewo County in Warmian-Masurian Voivodeship (north Poland)
Jesionowo, Olsztyn County in Warmian-Masurian Voivodeship (north Poland)
Jesionowo, West Pomeranian Voivodeship (north-west Poland)